The Hairy Ape is a 1944 American drama film based upon the 1922 play of the same name by Eugene O'Neill. It was directed by Alfred Santell and adapted by Robert Hardy Andrews and Decla Dunning. The film stars William Bendix, Susan Hayward, John Loder, Dorothy Comingore, Roman Bohnen, Tom Fadden and Alan Napier. The film was released on July 2, 1944, by United Artists.

Plot
Ship stoker Hank Smith (William Bendix) is a mountain of a man, but he is still very sensitive. So when the beautiful spoiled socialite Mildred Douglas (Susan Hayward) insults him with the slur "hairy ape," her words cut deep. At first the beastly Smith wants revenge for the insult, but after he thinks about it, he's more confused than anything else. After his ship docks, he departs into the city to track down the rich woman and find out the meaning behind her harsh words.

Cast 
William Bendix as Hank Smith
Susan Hayward as Mildred Douglas
John Loder as Tony Lazar
Dorothy Comingore as Helen Parker
Roman Bohnen as Paddy
Tom Fadden as Long
Alan Napier as MacDougald
Charles Cane as Gantry
Charles La Torre as Portuguese Proprietor
Paul Weigel as Doctor (uncredited)

References

External links 
 

1944 films
1944 drama films
American black-and-white films
American drama films
American films based on plays
1940s English-language films
Films about social class
Films based on works by Eugene O'Neill
Films directed by Alfred Santell
Films scored by Michel Michelet
Films set in New York City
United Artists films
1940s American films